Thermotoga subterranea is a thermophilic, anaerobic, non-spore-forming, motile and Gram-negative bacterium, with type strain SL1.

References

Further reading
Dworkin, Martin, and Stanley Falkow, eds. The Prokaryotes: Vol. 7: Proteobacteria: Delta and Epsilon Subclasses. Deeply Rooting Bacteria. Vol. 7. Springer, 2006.
Priest, Fergus G., and Michael Goodfellow, eds. Applied microbial systematics. Springer, 2000.

External links

LPSN

Thermophiles
Thermotogota
Bacteria described in 2000